Maurice MacGibbon, O. Cist. (died 1578) was a Roman Catholic prelate who served as Archbishop of Cashel (1567–1578).

Biography
Maurice MacGibbon was ordained a priest in the Cistercian Order.
On 4 June 1567, he was appointed during the papacy of Pope Pius V as Archbishop of Cashel.
On 15 June 1567, he was consecrated bishop by Egidio Valenti, Bishop of Nepi e Sutri, with Thomas Goldwell, Bishop of Saint Asaph, and Giacomo Galletti, Bishop of Alessano, serving as co-consecrators. 
He served as Archbishop of Cashel until his death in 1578.

References 

16th-century Roman Catholic archbishops in Ireland
Bishops appointed by Pope Pius V
1578 deaths
Cistercian bishops
Roman Catholic archbishops of Cashel